Pleasant Township is one of the thirteen townships of Henry County, Ohio, United States. As of the 2010 census the population was 2,026, of whom 871 lived in the unincorporated portions of the township.

Geography
Located in the southwestern corner of the county, it borders the following townships:
Flatrock Township - north
Monroe Township - northeast corner
Marion Township - east
Liberty Township, Putnam County - southeast corner
Palmer Township, Putnam County - south
Monroe Township, Putnam County - southwest corner
Highland Township, Defiance County - west
Richland Township, Defiance County - northwest corner

Most of the village of Holgate is located in northeastern Pleasant Township, and the village of New Bavaria (the smallest village in Henry County) is located in the center of the township.

Name and history
It is one of fifteen Pleasant Townships statewide.

Government
The township is governed by a three-member board of trustees, who are elected in November of odd-numbered years to a four-year term beginning on the following January 1. Two are elected in the year after the presidential election and one is elected in the year before it. There is also an elected township fiscal officer, who serves a four-year term beginning on April 1 of the year after the election, which is held in November of the year before the presidential election. Vacancies in the fiscal officership or on the board of trustees are filled by the remaining trustees.

Public education for the township is administered by the Holgate Local School District.

References

External links
County website

Townships in Henry County, Ohio
Townships in Ohio